Falls View is a census-designated place (CDP) in Fayette County, West Virginia, United States. As of the 2010 census, its population was 238. Falls View was established in the early 20th century as a residential village for managers from the Electro Metallurgical Co., part of the Union Carbide and Carbon Corporation. Electro Metallurgical operated four ferroalloy plants in the area, powered by hydroelectricity generated at the dam on Kanawha Falls.

See also
Hawks Nest Tunnel disaster

References

Census-designated places in Fayette County, West Virginia
Census-designated places in West Virginia
Populated places on the Kanawha River